West Platte is an unincorporated community in Platte County, in the U.S. state of Missouri.  It lies within the Kansas City metropolitan area.

The community lies west of Platte City, hence the name.

References

Unincorporated communities in Platte County, Missouri
Unincorporated communities in Missouri